Tranter Glacier is a glacier in the north part of Queen Elizabeth Range, draining into Nimrod Glacier between Mount Chivers and Mount Boman. Mapped by the United States Geological Survey (USGS) from tellurometer surveys and Navy air photos, 1960–62. Named by Advisory Committee on Antarctic Names (US-ACAN) for David L. Tranter, United States Antarctic Research Program (USARP) glaciologist at Roosevelt Island, 1962–63.

Glaciers of the Ross Dependency
Shackleton Coast